is a Japanese judoka. He won a silver medal at the 2009 World Judo Championships and the 2011 World Championships and a bronze medal at the 2010 World Judo Championships.

Hiroka also won a silver medal at the 2012 Summer Olympics at London, in the men's under 60 kg extra-lightweight category.

References

External links
 
 
 
 

1985 births
Living people
Japanese male judoka
Asian Games medalists in judo
Judoka at the 2008 Summer Olympics
Judoka at the 2012 Summer Olympics
Olympic judoka of Japan
Olympic silver medalists for Japan
Olympic medalists in judo
Medalists at the 2012 Summer Olympics
Judoka at the 2010 Asian Games
Sportspeople from Hiroshima Prefecture
Asian Games silver medalists for Japan
Medalists at the 2010 Asian Games
20th-century Japanese people
21st-century Japanese people